Spaulding (formerly Spalding Tract and Spaulding Tract) is a census-designated place in Lassen County, California. It is located on the west side of Eagle Lake, 2.1 miles (3.4 km) east-northeast of Whaleback Mountain and 3 miles (4.8 km) northeast of Eagle Lodge, at an elevation of 5138 feet (1566 m). Its population is 206 as of the 2020 census, up from 178 from the 2010 census.

In 1914, John S. Spalding laid out the town. The place was subdivided in 1924.

Geography
According to the United States Census Bureau, the CDP has a total area of 3.3 square miles (8.6 km), all land.

Demographics
The 2010 United States Census reported that Spaulding had a population of 178. The racial makeup of Spaulding was 168 (94.4%) White, 0 (0.0%) African American, 3 (1.7%) Native American, 1 (0.6%) Asian, 0 (0.0%) Pacific Islander, 1 (0.6%) from other races, and 5 (2.8%) from two or more races. Hispanic or Latino of any race were 6 persons (3.4%).

The Census reported that 178 people (100% of the population) lived in households, 0 (0%) lived in non-institutionalized group quarters, and 0 (0%) were institutionalized.

There were 94 households, out of which 7 (7.4%) had children under the age of 18 living in them, 51 (54.3%) were opposite-sex married couples living together, 7 (7.4%) had a female householder with no husband present, 5 (5.3%) had a male householder with no wife present.  There were 6 (6.4%) unmarried opposite-sex partnerships, and 0 (0%) same-sex married couples or partnerships. 26 households (27.7%) were made up of individuals, and 10 (10.6%) had someone living alone who was 65 years of age or older. The average household size was 1.89.  There were 63 families (67.0% of all households); the average family size was 2.22.

The population was spread out, with 10 people (5.6%) under the age of 18, 2 people (1.1%) aged 18 to 24, 12 people (6.7%) aged 25 to 44, 75 people (42.1%) aged 45 to 64, and 79 people (44.4%) who were 65 years of age or older.  The median age was 63.0 years. For every 100 females, there were 107.0 males.  For every 100 females age 18 and over, there were 104.9 males.

The homeowner vacancy rate was 18.0%; the rental vacancy rate was 53.3%.  158 people (88.8% of the population) lived in owner-occupied housing units and 20 people (11.2%) lived in rental housing units.

Politics

See also
Whaleback Fire

References

Census-designated places in Lassen County, California
Populated places established in 1914
Census-designated places in California